Red River Blue is the sixth studio album by American country music artist Blake Shelton. It was released on July 12, 2011, via Warner Bros. Records, and is Shelton's inaugural No. 1 album on the Billboard 200 chart, debuting at the top spot on July 30, 2011.  Its first single, "Honey Bee," peaked at number 1 on the Billboard Hot Country Songs chart. The album's second single is "God Gave Me You", written and originally recorded by Christian rock singer Dave Barnes. The title track is a duet with Shelton's former wife and fellow country singer Miranda Lambert.

Background
Shelton's marriage to Miranda Lambert and his debut as a judge on The Voice both occurred earlier in the same year as Red River Blues release, and one year before the album's release, Shelton had both joined the Grand Ole Opry and won the Country Music Association Award for Male Vocalist of the Year; the proximity of all these milestones to the album's release led Matt Bjorke of the website Roughstock to write that Red River Blue marked "the biggest album release of [Shelton's] career" since Shelton's self-titled debut album.

Although the release date for Red River Blue was originally scheduled for September 2011, this was moved up to July of that year, so as to capitalize on the success of the album's lead single, "Honey Bee". In April 2011, Shelton said, "Playing your cards too close to your chest doesn't pay out. I feel like right now if I've got a single that's exploding, easily my fastest climber, I don't want to do something like wait and put (the album) out in the fall. It's when you rally the troops and say, 'Man, we've got to get this thing done.'" According to Thom Jurek of AllMusic, Shelton "only had half an album finished" at the time and was "given two weeks to complete the rest".

Content
The album's second single is a cover of "God Gave Me You", which was written and originally recorded by Contemporary Christian music artist Dave Barnes. Shelton explained that he first heard the song during "a low point" in his relationship with Miranda Lambert and said, "for whatever reason I was flipping through stations and landed on a contemporary Christian station, and that song came on and I almost had to pull the truck over. It was one of those moments for me where I felt like I was hearing that song at that moment for a reason."

Shelton duets with Lambert on the album's title track. The song was originally recorded by Ray Stephenson, who co-wrote it with Buddy Owens. Shelton has said that his decision to cover the song was inspired by a time three years before the album's release when he and Lambert briefly broke up.

Shelton duets with Martina McBride on "I'm Sorry", which had first been pitched to Shelton for one of his earlier albums, but Shelton was initially unsure if he was the right vocalist to record it. Calling it "a hard song to sing", he explained, "Once we got in there and cut it, I realized I can be comfortable with this."

Shelton wanted Red River Blue's third single to be "one of the rowdier songs on the album" and considered "Get Some" before "Drink On It" was chosen. "Drink On It" was the last song Shelton recorded for the album.

The album's fourth single, "Over", was written by Paul Jenkins and David Elliott Johnson, who originally planned on recording the song themselves for a rock band they were going to start together. They wrote the song at least a decade before Shelton recorded it.

Reception

Commercial
The album debuted on the Billboard 200 at number one with 116,000 sold in the US in its debut week. It is Blake Shelton's highest charting album and his first album to reach number one on this ch"art. As of March 2015, the album has sold 1,240,000 copies in the US. In 2016, it was certified double-platinum with sales of 2,000,000 units.

Critical

Red River Blue received a mixed to postive response from music critics. At Metacritic, which assigns a normalized rating out of 100 to reviews from mainstream critics, the album received an average score of 62, based on 9 reviews.

The positive reviews came in from About.com, American Songwriter Entertainment Weekly, Nashville Country Club, Roughstock, Taste of Country, Urban Country News and the USA Today. Critic Scott Sexton of About.com rated the album a four out of five stars, and called this effort "Blake Shelton being at the top of his game". Critic Allen Morrison of American Songwriter rated the album a three and a half out of five stars, and evoked how "Red River Blue should do nothing to slow his momentum." Critic Melissa Maerz of Entertainment Weekly graded the album a B, and exclaimed "Aww!" Emily Wetta music critic for Nashville Country Club wrote that "While most of the songs have a word or phrase that is continually repeated, it still won’t stop you from listening to the album on repeat. With heart warming love songs and the occasional feel good song, Red River Blue has great balance. Full of honest and raw emotion, Blake wins the hearts of all women and with songs like 'Get Some' wins the male audience." Roughstock critic Matt Bjorke rated the album a four out of five stars, and called the album "...a collection of songs that may be the most satisfying album of Blake Shelton’s career." Music-critic Billy Dukes of Taste of Country rated the album as being perfect, and said "‘Red River Blue’ is Shelton hitting a homerun [sic] in a clutch situation as the eyes of the country music world are bearing down on him." Liv Carter music critic for Urban Country News wrote "Red River Blue shows Shelton has reached the point in his career where he does exactly what he wants. Well put-together, greatly executed and (mostly) well-written...Red River Blue is a confident, contemporary country album which will cement Blake Shelton’s country superstar status." Music critic Brian Mansfield from USA Today wrote that "Longtime fans can hear Red River Blue'''s roguishly charming performances and feel confident that the Country Music Association's male vocalist of the year will find his biggest success."

However, the album had some mixed reviews come in from AllMusic, The A.V. Club, PopMatters, Rolling Stone and Slant Magazine. Critic Thom Jurek of AllMusic rated the album a three out of five stars, and called the album "uncharacteristically tender." The A.V. Club critic Steven Hyden gave the album a C grade, and commented that "He's in the creamy, mushy middle, which is exactly where he aims on Red River Blue." Critic Dave Heaton of PopMatters gave the album a five out of ten stars, and noted that "Red River Blue's songs generally feel both cynical and overly familiar". Rolling Stone music critic Will Hermes rated the album a two and a half out of five stars, and wrote that "Red River Blue is unlikely to offend anyone...[and it] shows similarly versatile market savvy." Likewise, critic Jonathan Keefe of Slant Magazine gave it the same rating, and criticized the album because it "...proves that he's a capable singer who chooses to sing some lackluster songs."

Track listing

Personnel

 Tim Akers – Hammond B-3 organ, piano
 Jessi Alexander – background vocals
 Mike Brignardello – bass guitar
 Tom Bukovac – electric guitar
 Perry Coleman – background vocals
 Eric Darken – percussion
 Connie Ellisor – violin
 Paul Franklin – pedal steel guitar
 Aubrey Haynie – fiddle, mandolin
 Wes Hightower – background vocals
 Paul Jenkins – electric guitar
 Mike Johnson – pedal steel guitar
 Elizabeth Lamb – background vocals
 Miranda Lambert – background vocals on "Red River Blue"
 Troy Lancaster – electric guitar
 Martina McBride – background vocals on "I'm Sorry"
 Chris McHugh – drums, percussion
 Brent Mason – electric guitar
 Greg Morrow – drums, percussion
 Gordon Mote – Hammond B-3 organ, piano, programming 
 Russ Pahl – pedal steel guitar
 Carole Rabinowitz – cello
 Eberhard Ramm – viola
 Blake Shelton – lead vocals
 Adam Shoenfeld – electric guitar
 Pamela Sixfin – violin
 Jimmie Lee Sloas – bass guitar
 Bryan Sutton – acoustic guitar
 Ilya Toshinsky – acoustic guitar

Charts

Weekly charts

Year-end charts

Singles

AccoladesRed River Blue'' was nominated for Best Country Album at the 54th Annual Grammy Awards. At that same ceremony, "Honey Bee" and "God Gave Me You" were nominated respectively in the Best Country Solo Performance and Best Country Song categories. The following year, "Over" earned Shelton another Grammy nomination in the Best Country Solo Performance category.

Certifications

Notes

2011 albums
Blake Shelton albums
Warner Records albums
Albums produced by Scott Hendricks